The Milwaukee Brewers are an American professional baseball team based in Milwaukee. They compete in Major League Baseball (MLB) as a member club of the National League (NL) Central division. The Brewers are named for the city's association with the brewing industry. Since 2001, they have played their home games at American Family Field, which was named Miller Park through the 2020 season and has a seating capacity of 41,900 people.

The team was founded in 1969 as the Seattle Pilots, an expansion team of the American League (AL), in Seattle, Washington. The Pilots played their home games at Sick's Stadium. After only one season, the team relocated to Milwaukee, becoming known as the Brewers and playing their home games at Milwaukee County Stadium. In 1998, the Brewers joined the National League. They are the only franchise to play in four different divisions since the advent of divisional play in Major League Baseball in 1969. They are also one of two current MLB franchises to switch leagues in the modern era (1900–present), the other being the Houston Astros.

After winning the 1982 American League Championship Series (ALCS) against the California Angels, the Brewers faced off against the St. Louis Cardinals in the World Series, losing 4–3. In 2011, the Brewers defeated the Arizona Diamondbacks to win the 2011 National League Division Series (NLDS), 3–2, but lost in the National League Championship Series (NLCS) to the eventual World Series champion Cardinals, 4–2. In 2018, the Brewers swept the Colorado Rockies in the NLDS, 3–0, but lost the NLCS to the Los Angeles Dodgers, 4–3.

From 1969 through 2022, the Brewers' overall win–loss record is 4,123–4,391.

History

Originating as an expansion team in 1969, in Seattle, Washington, as the Seattle Pilots, the club played for one season in the American League West Division before being acquired in bankruptcy court by Bud Selig, who then moved the team to Milwaukee. They would continue to play in the West Division for two more years. Before the beginning of the 1972 season the Brewers agreed to switch over to the American League East to make room for the Texas Rangers who, as the Washington Senators, had relocated from Washington, DC. Beginning in 1994, due to divisional realignment, the Brewers moved to the newly created American League Central division. In all, the Brewers were part of the American League from their creation in 1969 through the 1997 season, after which they moved to the National League Central Division. Milwaukee had previously been a National League city when its team was the Milwaukee Braves (1953–1965). It had also been an American League city, albeit briefly, when the original Milwaukee Brewers became an AL charter team in 1901 before moving to St. Louis to become the Browns the following season. Between 1902 and 1952, Milwaukee was home to the Milwaukee Brewers of the American Association (AAA) and the Milwaukee Bears of the Negro National League. Both clubs played at Borchert Field.

In 1981, Milwaukee won the American League East Division in the second half of the strike-shortened season. In the playoffs, they lost the divisional series to the New York Yankees, three games to two.

In 1982, Milwaukee won the American League East Division and the American League Pennant, earning their only World Series appearance to date as the Brewers. In the Series, they lost to the St. Louis Cardinals four games to three.

In 2008, for the first time in the 26 years since their World Series appearance, the Brewers advanced to postseason play by winning the National League wild card. They were eliminated in the National League Division Series by the eventual World Series champion Philadelphia Phillies.

On September 23, 2011, the Milwaukee Brewers clinched their first division title in 29 years. They won the National League Division Series in five games over the Arizona Diamondbacks, but lost the National League Championship Series to the eventual World Series champion St. Louis Cardinals in six games.

In 2018, the Brewers clinched a spot in the post-season for the first time since 2011 with a 2–1 victory over the St. Louis Cardinals on September 26, 2018.

On September 29, they tied with the Cubs for first place in the National League Central, with a record of 95–67; at the end of the day on September 30, the Cubs and Brewers were still tied. This tie was broken on October 1, when the Brewers defeated the Cubs 3–1 in the NL Central tiebreaker to improve to 96–67 and win the division by one game. They went on to defeat the Colorado Rockies 3–0 to win the NLDS, but in the following NLCS, they lost out to the Los Angeles Dodgers in 7 games.

In 2019, the Brewers returned to the postseason and made an appearance in the National League Wild Card Game, where they were defeated by the eventual World Series champion Washington Nationals 4–3.

In 2020, the club made the postseason for a third consecutive year, making the expanded Playoffs as the 8th seed losing both games to the eventual champion Dodgers.

In 2021, Giannis Antetokounmpo became a minority owner of the Brewers.

In 2021, the Brewers clinched the NL Central title with a 95-67 record. However, they lost to the eventual World Series champions Atlanta Braves in 4 games in the NLDS.

Uniforms

1970–1977

The first Brewers uniforms were "hand-me-downs" from the Seattle Pilots. Because the move to Milwaukee received final approval less than a week before the start of the season, there was no time to order new uniforms. Selig had originally planned to change the Brewers' colors to navy blue and red in honor of the minor league American Association's Milwaukee Brewers (and are the colors of the Braves), but was forced to simply remove the Seattle markings from the Pilots' blue-and-gold uniforms and sew "BREWERS" on the front. However, the outline of the Pilots' logo remained visible. The uniforms had unique striping on the sleeves left over from the Pilots days. The cap was an updated version of the Milwaukee Braves cap: solid blue, with a yellow block "M" on the front. Ultimately, it was decided to keep blue and gold as the team colors, and they have remained so ever since (even though the team darkened the shades of both colors in 1994).

The Brewers finally got their own flannel design in 1971, but only for their home jerseys. This design was essentially the same as the one used in 1970, but with blue and yellow piping on the sleeves and collar. Meanwhile, the road jerseys did not add the trim around the collar and kept the wide-banded striping on the sleeves from the Pilots era. Additionally, player numbers were added to the front of both jerseys for 1971.

In 1972, the Brewers entered the double-knit era with uniforms based upon their flannels: all white with "BREWERS" on the front and blue and yellow trim on the sleeves, neck, waistband and down the side of the pants; the uniform took on the form of a pullover jersey and an elastic waistband. The road uniforms remained blue, although a darker shade than those of 1970 and '71. In 1974, a yellow-paneled cap was added to the road uniforms, and the "sanitation sock" on the road uniforms were also changed from white to yellow. This is the uniform that Hank Aaron wore with the club in his final seasons and that Robin Yount wore in his first. During this period, the logo of the club was the Beer Barrel Man, which had been used by the previous minor league Brewers since at least the 1940s. The Brewers mascot, Bernie Brewer (a man with a large yellow mustache wearing a Brewers hat) was introduced in 1973.

1978–1993

The Brewers unveiled new uniforms for the 1978 season. The uniforms continued to use the pullover jersey/beltless pants combo, and featured pinstripes with a solid-blue collar and waistband. The road uniforms continued to be powder blue, but for the first time the city name, "Milwaukee", graced the chest in an upward slant in script form (It was the first time "Milwaukee" appeared on any MLB jersey; the Braves never displayed the city name on their road jerseys during their 13 seasons in the city). In addition, this season saw the introduction of the logo that was to define the club: "M" and "B" in the shape of a baseball glove. The logo was designed by Tom Meindel, an art history student at the University of Wisconsin-Eau Claire. The home cap was solid blue, and the road cap was blue with a yellow front panel. Additionally, their batting helmets had a white front panel. The club wore these uniforms in their pennant-winning season of 1982. Only minor changes were made until 1990; the color of the road uniforms changed to gray in 1985 while the blue-yellow-blue road cap and white-paneled batting helmets were abandoned at the same time.

In 1990, the Brewers made significant modifications to their uniforms, switching from pullover to button-down jerseys (the last American League team to do so; four National League teams still wore pullovers in 1990). Their individual uniforms showed other changes as well; at home, the blue piping was removed and the block lettered "BREWERS" was changed to a script version with a tail similar to the script used on road uniforms, while those outfits had their piping changed from blue-yellow-blue to blue-yellow. The road jerseys were the first uniforms in franchise history to feature player names on the back, introduced in the first year of this uniform set; names were added to the home jerseys beginning in 1993, the last year of this set.

1994–1999
In 1994, to commemorate the Brewers' 25th year in Milwaukee, the team completely redesigned their uniforms. The ball-in-glove logo was removed and replaced with a stylized interlocking "M" and "B" set on a pair of crossed bats and a diamond background. The royal blue changed to navy blue, while the yellow changed to a metallic gold. Forest green was added as a third color. The jerseys swapped pinstripes for retro-themed piping around the collar, buttons, and sleeves, following a trend that was popular in the 1990s. The uniforms' lettering had the same style of letters as the new cap logo with heavily stylized "BREWERS" lettering on the home jerseys and "MILWAUKEE" on the road grays. For the first time, an alternative jersey was introduced. It was navy blue with the home "BREWERS" lettering on the front and featured the Brewers' logo on the lower left side. On all three jerseys, the first and last letters were larger than the rest. The caps featured the interlocking "MB" logo (without the bats or diamond) on both the home and away versions. The home cap was completely navy blue, while the away cap featured a navy blue crown and a forest green bill.

In 1997, the uniforms were slightly modified, with the main logo being removed from the caps and replaced with an "M". All navy caps were worn with both the home and away uniforms; the home hats featured a white "M" and the road caps had a gold "M." The green socks that had previously been worn on the road were changed to navy blue. The blue alternate jersey placed the player's number on the lower left side instead of the logo, and numbers were also added to the lower left side of the white and gray jerseys. Also, all letters were made the same size.

2000–2019

Before the 2000 season, to coincide with the anticipated opening of Miller Park, the Brewers changed their uniforms again. The block letters on the front were replaced with "Brewers" in a flowing script, and green was removed as the third color. The cap logo was a script "M", similar in style to the Miller logo, with a head of barley underlining it, symbolizing Milwaukee's beer-making industry. The home uniforms also featured a patch on the left sleeve consisting of the cap logo with a gold outline of the state of Wisconsin behind it, showing the Brewers statewide appeal. The road uniforms were grey and featured the same script "Brewers" on the front, with a simple patch on the left sleeve bearing a script "Milwaukee". There was also an alternate navy blue jersey that had the same features as the home jersey.

The debut of the new uniforms was supposed to coincide with the opening of Miller Park, but a crane collapse in July 1999 which killed three workers and damaged the incomplete stadium delayed its opening until 2001.

In 2006, the Brewers introduced Retro Sundays, when the Brewers would wear uniforms featuring the "ball-in-glove" logo. The uniforms are similar to the uniforms worn from 1978 to 1989, but with some modern modifications, such as the uniforms having a button-down front instead of being a pullover jersey, displaying players' last names on the backs of the jerseys, and a "ball-in-glove" logo patch on the left sleeve. In 2007, the Retro day was changed from Sunday to Friday, though they may also be worn outside of those days if a starting pitcher chooses the retro uniforms to wear during his start. In 2010, the Brewers debuted a new alternate road jersey which, like the other alternate jersey, is navy blue, but bears a script "Milwaukee" on the front. In 2013, a gold alternate jersey with "Brewers" on the front was introduced, as well.

During the off-season before the 2013 season, the Brewers allowed fans to design their own Milwaukee Brewers uniforms. Three finalists were chosen, which fans were given the opportunity to vote for their favorite through the Brewers website. The winning uniform was designed by Ben Peters of Richfield, Minnesota, and was worn by the Brewers for two spring training games.

In 2016, the Brewers replaced their road navy and home gold alternates with a new navy alternate jersey. The uniform is similar to the previous road navy alternate but with yellow replacing gold as the trim color, and is paired with a navy cap featuring the "ball-and-glove" logo. From 2017 to 2019, both alternate navy uniforms were used for both home and away games, and each were worn more often than the traditional white and gray tops.

2020–present
On November 18, 2019, the Brewers published "Glove Story", a series of videos and written work showcasing the new branding of the team, with a uniform unveiling event at Miller Park occurring the same evening. The look throws back to past iterations of designs used for the team, with a modernized version of the classic "ball-in-glove" logo being the centerpiece of the new identity. The navy blue from the previous logo and uniform set was retained, but the metallic gold was replaced with mustard gold, and royal blue was returned to the team's color scheme for the first time since 1993.

The set included a cream home uniform with "Brewers" and numbers in stylized block letters (a nod to Milwaukee's "Cream City" nickname), a home alternate pinstriped white uniform which shares the same features as the cream uniforms, a grey road uniform with "Milwaukee" and numbers in stylized block letters, and a road alternate navy uniform with "Milwaukee" in script letters and numbers in stylized block letters. The home sleeve patch features a navy baseball with stylized barley seams, while the road sleeve patch features the gold Wisconsin map with Cream City bricks and a baseball to represent Milwaukee's location. Initially, the gold-paneled navy cap was only used with the navy alternate uniform whereas the other uniforms were paired with the all-navy cap. However, beginning in 2022, the alternate gold-paneled cap was used exclusively on the road, with the all-navy cap worn only on home games. Both designs have the modernized "ball-in-glove" logo in front.

In 2022, the Brewers added a "City Connect" uniform in conjunction with Nike. The uniform is powder blue with white pants and features the "Brew Crew" nickname in stylized gold letters and navy trim. A stylized baseball shaped like an enclosed grill is emblazoned on the right sleeve. Caps are powder blue with navy brim and features both the "MKE" abbreviation in gold and the city's "414" area code in navy.

Achievements

Awards

Four Brewers have won the MLB Most Valuable Player Award during their careers with the team: Rollie Fingers (1981), Robin Yount (1982 and 1989), Ryan Braun (2011), and Christian Yelich (2018). Three pitchers have won the Cy Young Award: Rollie Fingers (1981), Pete Vuckovich (1982), and Corbin Burnes (2021). Three players have been named Rookie of the Year: Pat Listach (1992), Ryan Braun (2007), and Devin Williams (2020).

Two Brewers have won the Hank Aaron Award: Prince Fielder (2007) and Christian Yelich (2018 and 2019). Dave Parker (1990) is the only Brewer to have won the Edgar Martínez Award. Four players have been recognized with top relief pitcher honors. Rollie Fingers (1981) and John Axford (2011) won the Rolaids Relief Man Award, and Josh Hader (2018, 2019, and 2021) and Devin Williams (2020) won the Trevor Hoffman NL Reliever of the Year Award. Cecil Cooper (1983) is the only Brewer to win the Roberto Clemente Award. Six Brewers have won the Rawlings Gold Glove Award, two have won the Wilson Defensive Player of the Year Award, and ten have won the Silver Slugger Award. Seventy Brewers have been selected to play in the Major League Baseball All-Star Game, and five have been named to All-MLB Teams.

Hall of Famers

Eight Brewers have been inducted in the Baseball Hall of Fame after spending some or all of their careers with the team. Robin Yount is the only member to have played his entire career with Milwaukee.

Ford C. Frick Award recipients

One Brewers broadcaster has won the Ford C. Frick Award.

Retired numbers

The Brewers have retired five uniform numbers in honor of former players and team personnel. This ensures that the number will be associated with one person of particular importance to the team. Additionally, the number 42 has been retired throughout professional baseball in honor of Jackie Robinson. Though not retired, the number 17 has not been issued since Jim Gantner's retirement in 1992. Gantner, however, later wore the number from 1996 to 1997 when he returned as the Brewers' first base coach.

Wisconsin Athletic Hall of Fame
Nine individuals associated with the Brewers have been inducted in the Wisconsin Athletic Hall of Fame.

Season-by-season results

Franchise leaders

These are records of players with the best performance in distinct statistical categories during their career with the Brewers.

Batting

Pitching

Roster

Managers

Through 54 seasons of play, the Brewers franchise has employed 19 managers. The records of the last five managers are shown below.

Minor league affiliations

The Milwaukee Brewers farm system consists of eight minor league affiliates.

Radio and television

The Brewers' flagship radio station is WTMJ (620 AM/103.3 FM). Bob Uecker, a winner of the Ford C. Frick Award from the Baseball Hall of Fame, joined the Brewers in 1970, when the team moved from Seattle, and has been with the team ever since. Alongside Uecker are Jeff Levering and Lane Grindle. Levering joined the team's radio broadcast in 2015 as a fill-in for Uecker on select road games and Grindle joined the team in 2016, replacing Joe Block, who had left to join the Pittsburgh Pirates after the 2015 season. Block replaced Cory Provus who had left to become the Minnesota Twins lead broadcaster on radio after the 2011 season. Provus, formerly of WGN radio in Chicago, replaced Jim Powell, who left Milwaukee for the Atlanta Braves radio network. Powell in turn replaced Pat Hughes, who departed to do play-by-play for the Cubs on WGN in 1996. The Brewers radio broadcasts usually feature a 2-2-2-1-2 format where Uecker does solo play-by-play for the first, middle and last 2 innings, while Levering does innings 3-4 and 7, and both doing analysis throughout and varied presentation for extra innings games. Starting with the 2014 season Uecker cut back on the number of road games he works due to health concerns, mainly involving West Coast trips and distant road games in Colorado and Atlanta; Block handled the play-by-play, with former Brewer and Met Darryl Hamilton on color for the first series at Atlanta.

Select daytime home games were formerly broadcast in Spanish over Waukesha-licensed ESPN Deportes Radio affiliate WRRD (1510), with Jaime Cano serving as play-by-play announcer. In 2017 the station was purchased by another party which instituted an English-language talk format, effectively ending that arrangement.

Most of the team's television broadcasts are aired on Bally Sports Wisconsin. Brian Anderson, who has worked on The Golf Channel, took over as the Brewers' play-by-play announcer for the 2007 season. He replaced Daron Sutton, who joined the Arizona Diamondbacks. The color commentator is Bill Schroeder, a former major league catcher who played six of his eight seasons for the Brewers. As of 2014 Schroeder is in his 20th season as the Brewers' color commentator. The 2010 season was the first year where all of Fox Sports Wisconsin's games were broadcast in high definition. Anderson (who also is a part of TBS playoff coverage) also provided play-by-play for the 2011 NLCS due to Ernie Johnson stepping aside for the year due to a medical situation with his son. Since 2014, as Anderson's Turner Sports duties have increased along with the addition of NCAA college basketball and NBA on TNT play-by-play duties, Wisconsin Badgers football and men's college basketball radio announcer Matt Lepay has served as play-by-play man on days when Anderson has other assignments for Turner Sports.

From 2007 to 2011, the Brewers and FSN Wisconsin subcontracted to Weigel Broadcasting a package of 15 games and one spring training game over-the-air on WMLW-CA (then-Channel 41/58.2) in Milwaukee each season with FSN Wisconsin producing the telecasts and Weigel selling air time for each of those games and additional games added depending on weather postponements and pennant race standings (WMLW-CA games would air on the outstate FSN Wisconsin network for the remainder of the state). The deal was ended before the 2012 season in order to facilitate full-season HD coverage on FSN Wisconsin and distribution complications, along with the addition of a "Plus" channel for Milwaukee Bucks play-by-play conflict situations. Weigel continues to air a few Sunday home broadcasts per year with Spanish language play-by-play on Telemundo affiliate WYTU-LD (Channels 63/58.4), which produces their own broadcasts using FSN's camera positions with Hector Molina on play-by-play and bilingual WDJT sports anchor Kevin Holden on color.

Five of the six major network television stations in Milwaukee, along with WMLW-CA, have carried game broadcasts over the years, with WTMJ-TV being the original broadcaster in the 1970s. WVTV carried the team for the bulk of the 1980s and early 1990s, with WCGV-TV following from 1994 until 2004, and WISN-TV carrying select Sunday games at the beginning of the 2000s. WITI is the only station not to have carried local coverage of the team through its history (though former WITI sports anchor and current Bucks play-by-play man Jim Paschke was the team's TV announcer during its time with WVTV and portions of WCGV's coverage contract), although it has aired national games from CBS and Fox involving the Brewers through the years.

References

External links

 
 Milwaukee Brewers at ESPN
 Milwaukee Brewers at FOX Sports

 
Major League Baseball teams
Cactus League
Baseball in Milwaukee
Baseball teams established in 1969